The USF2000 Championship Presented by Cooper Tires is an American racing series using the American variation of the Formula Ford formula, "F2000", that resumed operation for the 2010 season. As of 2022, it is sanctioned by the United States Auto Club, and is the first rung of the Road to Indy.

History

Andersen/Foschi era
The series was initially founded by Doug Powell in 1990, and regularly fielded over 60 entries per race. In the first seasons the series was mainly based in the western part of the United States sanctioned by the United States Auto Club. For 1992 the series started a Western Division and an Eastern Division, the Eastern Division being headed by Dan Andersen and Mike Foschi. In the 1992 season the race at Indianapolis Raceway Park (Night before the 500) and the race at Heartland Park Topeka (East-West Shootout) counted towards both championships and attracted huge fields. It was a regular site at Indianapolis that drivers had to qualify on time to make the grid for the race. In the same year the Sports Car Club of America founded the American Continental Championship. All three classes utilized the same set of rules, based on the SCCA Formula Continental regulations. In 1994 both USAC series were merged into one national championship.

For 1995 the SCCA series merged with the USAC series. Creating one national championship co-sanctioned between the SCCA and USAC. The series ran on the same tracks as high ranking series such as the Indy Racing League, NASCAR Cup Series and Trans-Am Series. Many drivers graduated into the higher-ranking series such as Indy 500 winner Dan Wheldon.

Jon Baytos era
In June 2001 the series promoter, Formula Motorsports, Inc. (headed by Andersen and Foschi), was sold to Primus Racing, Inc. (headed by Jon Baytos). Jon Baytos introduced a number of controversial rule changes that brought the series out of alignment with similar Sports Car Club of America classes. The two liter Ford NEA engine was replaced by a two-liter Ford Zetec engine which produced ten horsepower more. The shock package was also upgraded. The series also ran under Grand-Am Road Racing sanctioning. The number of competitors dwindled and the series folded at the end of the 2006 season. For 2004 until the series folding in 2006 SCCA Pro Racing was the sanctioning body for the series.

IndyCar era

For 2010, the U.S. F2000 National Championship returned under the leadership of Dan Andersen, who then owned professional racing teams in Star Mazda and Indy Lights. The intent was to return F2000 to its status as a stepping stone to higher calibers of professional open wheel racing in the United States. The car rule package includes two sub-classes: the Championship class required an Elán/Van Diemen chassis with a league mandated aerodynamics package, and a sealed Mazda MZR engine. In 2017, a new chassis was introduced. The Tatuus USF-17 is a significant technology leap over the previous Van Diemen USF2000 chassis. It is a full carbon monocoque chassis built to the latest FIA F3 test specifications utilizing the same Mazda MZR 2.0-liter naturally aspirated engine with additional safety features to meet the specific needs of racing in the United States.

The USF2000 champion receives a scholarship package from Mazda to advance to the Pro Mazda Championship Presented by Cooper Tires. Drivers from a wide array of entry level series around the world compete head-to-head each season for a fully funded spot in the USF2000 championship in the Road to Indy Shootout. This shootout has been held since 2016.

Timeline

Sub-championships

Throughout the years the USF2000 series featured a number of sub-championships competitors could be eligible for.

Oval Crown
In 1996 the series introduced the Road to Indy Oval Crown. Races at Walt Disney World Speedway, Pikes Peak International Raceway, Lowe's Motor Speedway and other ovals counted towards the Oval Crown. The championship was continued until the 2002 season.

American Continental Championship
Named after the former SCCA F2000 series, the American Continental Championship, was introduced in 1999. The second tier class was open for Formula Ford 2000 cars manufactured between 1990 and 1996 and also Van Diemen chassis built in 1997. The class continued until the 2003 season. As only three drivers competed the class in 2003, the class was dropped for 2004.

National class
With the re-introduction of USF2000 in 2010, the National class was introduced. For 2010 and 2011 the national class was open to every Formula Continental spec car. For 2012 and 2013 the Formula Continental cars were outlawed. The cars allowed were the SCCA Formula Enterprises cars. The Formula Enterprises had their own pro series in 2010 and 2011, a number of the cars joined the USF2000 field for 2012. For 2012 and 2013 the Formula Enterprises cars were not allowed at Indianapolis Raceway Park. Due to low car counts, the National Class was discontinued for 2014 and 2015. The class returned in 2016, open to all Sports Car Club of America-legal FC (Formula Continental) cars, from any chassis manufacturer, dating back to 2000. With the introduction of the new Tatuus chassis in 2017, the National class was slated to be for Van Diemen cars conforming to the prior Championship Class spec. However, the first weekend only saw a single National class entry and the class was subsequently abandoned.

Cars

pre-2010
The original USF2000 series was not a spec series as it is today. The cars were first built to SCCA Formula Continental specifications. The cars, constructed by a wide variety of manufacturers, all had a spaceframe chassis. The car featured aluminium bodywork and aerodynamic aides such as a front- and rearwing. Until 2002 the cars were fitted with Ford Pinto engines, coded NEA. It was a naturally aspirated engine with a 2.000cc capacity. The engine had a SOHC valvetrain. Most of the parts were production Ford parts of the engine found in the Ford Escort RS2000. The manual gearbox had a maximum of four forward gears. The engines were built by various companies such as Quicksilver Racengines and Elite Engines. Different spec tires were used throughout the years. In the early 2000s Yokohama tires were used.

Zetec era
For 2002 the Ford Zetec engine was introduced to the series. Quicksilver Racengines and Elite Engines were selected as the only engine builders for the series. The engine came out of the first generation Ford Focus. The engine was strictly regulated and spec.

Van Diemen DP08
For the relaunch in 2010 Van Diemen was selected as the supplier of the spec chassis for the series. Initially the car was named the Van Diemen DP08 the car was renamed  Élan DP08 after Van Diemen was fully integrated into the latter. The car was initially designed to compete in the SCCA Formula Continental ranks but was heavily upgraded to run in the USF2000 series. The upgrades included a stronger steel spaceframe, improved side crashboxes and new brakes. Elite Engines was selected as the sole engine builder for the series. The company headed by former driver Steve Knapp builds the engines before shipping them to the Andersen Promotions headquarters.

Tatuus USF-17

In 2016, at the 100th running of the Indianapolis 500, the new car for the 2017 U.S. F2000 National Championship was unveiled. Italian company Tatuus designed and built the USF-17. For the first time in series history the car featured a carbon fiber monocoque, opposed to the previously used spaceframe chassis. The car was based on the Tatuus designed F4-T014 FIA Formula 4 car. The engine basically remained the same but was now connected to a Cosworth SQ6 engine control unit. Sadev provides the six-speed sequential gearbox. The USF-17 can be upgraded to the PM-18 to compete in the Indy Pro 2000 Championship.

Champions

Unified championship

Constructors championship
Between 1997 and 2002 a constructors championship was contested. Only constructors who were Associate Members of the USF2000 championship were eligible to score points.

 These manufacturers were not Associate Members of the USF2000 championship and thus were not eligible to score points.

See also
Formula Ford
F2000 Championship Series

References

External links
Official website
IRL bouwt op: U.S. F2000 National Championship (In Dutch)
 

 
Auto racing series in the United States
Auto racing series in Canada
One-make series
Formula racing series
Road to Indy